Onogur,  is a small village in Tervel Municipality, Dobrich Province, in northeastern Bulgaria.

References

Villages in Dobrich Province